Children of the Great Extinction is the sixth studio album by the heavy metal band Becoming the Archetype. The album was released on August 26, 2022, through Solid State. It is the band's first album in ten years since their hiatus, and also features the return of Jason Wisdom and Brent "Duck" Duckett to the band with Seth Hecox, the first album to have this lineup since Celestial Completion.The album was produced by Nate Washburn (My Epic), and the album artwork was designed once again by Dan Seagrave, who had created the artworks for three of their albums.

Background
In an interview with New Release Today, Wisdom said, "We talked about it a few years ago, right before COVID-19 happened. We talked about writing new music and then we got shut down for about a year and a half. Then, we met with our producer, Nate Washburn, and wrote some great new songs. The band hadn't been active for many years, but I think our reunion was mostly spurred on by the curiosity of wanting to try recording again. It's hard to write an album that'll live up to expectations after being gone for so many years, that's probably why I waited so long myself."

Track listing

Personnel
Becoming the Archetype
 Jason Wisdom – unclean vocals, bass, gang vocals
 Brent Duckett – drums, gang vocals
 Seth Hecox – rhythm guitar, keyboards, clean vocals

Additional Personnel
 Daniel Gailey (Phinehas, Fit for a King) – lead guitar and solo on "The Lost Colony"
 Alex Kenis (Aletheian, Solamors) – lead guitar and solo on "The Calling"
 Ryan Clark (Demon Hunter) – guest vocals on "The Ruins"
 Nate Washburn – production, mixing, engineering, lead guitar 
 Troy Glessner – mastering
 Tyler Washburn – additional synths
 Jarret Chastain – gang vocals
 Samuel Holcomb – gang vocals
 Shaun Hughes – gang vocals
 Jim Hughes – layout
 Dan Seagrave – album artwork

References

Becoming the Archetype albums
Solid State Records albums
2022 albums